Robert Ghanem (8 May 1942 – 10 February 2019) was a Lebanese lawyer and politician.

Early life
Ghanem hailed from a Maronite family. He was the son of Lebanese army general Iskandar Ghanem.

Career
Robert Ghanem was a longtime deputy of the National Assembly of Lebanon and was the minister of education in the second government of Rafic Hariri. Robert Ghanem was a candidate for President of Lebanon and participated in the 2014 Lebanese presidential election.

Views
Robert Ghanem was a member of the March 14 alliance. But nevertheless, Ghanem is viewed as a moderate politician with relations across the political spectrum.

Personal life
Ghanem was married to the journalist Viviane Haddad since 23 January 1975 and father of two children. Ghanem died on 11 February 2019 after a brief illness.

References

External links

20th-century Lebanese lawyers
1942 births
2019 deaths
Lebanese Maronites
People of the Lebanese Civil War
Education ministers of Lebanon
Members of the Parliament of Lebanon
Candidates for President of Lebanon